Sargodar-e Kalatu (also Romanized as Sargodār-e Kalātū) is a village in Abnama Rural District, in the Central District of Rudan County, Hormozgan Province, Iran. As of the 2006 census, its population was 25, in 6 families.

References 

Populated places in Rudan County